Urlabari is a city and municipality in Morang District in the Koshi Zone of south-eastern Nepal.  It is considered to be the second largest city in Morang District after Biratnagar.  At the time of the 1991 Nepal census it had a population of 18,224.
At the time of the 2011 Nepal census it had a population of 35,166 and 8,165 households.

It is located 60 km eastern part of the metropolitan city Biratnagar. According to the declaration as a municipality from the government on 2071-01-25 to Urlabari, Morang. Jhapa lies to the east of this municipality. From 2071 census the total population is 54,696. where 29,548 are the woman and 25,148 are men lived with 12,530 households.

Urlabari is bordered by Damak Municipality in the east, Patharisanichare Municipality and Letang Municipality in the west,
Miklajung Village Development in the north, and Ratuwamai municipality in the south.

Health Post details: 1 Government Hospital, 1 Health Checkpoint and 6 Private Health posts

Community forests: Srijana community forest, Sunjhoda community forest, Salbari community forest and Beteni community forest

Child Development Center: 6

Government education institutes: There are more than 10 government education institutes, including: Urlabari Bahumukhi Campus, Radhika Higher Secondary School, Sunpakkwa Higher Secondary, Radhika Secondary School, Srijana Secondary School, Durga Secondary School, Sunjodha Higher Secondary School, Pashupati Higher Secondary school, and Bhrikuti Model Academy.

There are more 20 privately held secondary schools and higher schools.

References

 
Nepal municipalities established in 2014
Municipalities in Koshi Province
Municipalities in Morang District